Laloorinu Parayanullathu (What Has Laloor To Say) is an Indian documentary film produced by Joseph Paneagaden and directed by Sathish Kalathil under the banner of Digital Film Makers Forum in Malayalam Language. The documentary narrates about the problems of Municipal Garbage dumping in Laloor, a suburban area in Thrissur Municipal Corporation.  The film reveals the history of the waste dumping in Laloor since the period of Sakthan Thampuran who was the ruler of the Kingdom of Cochin and first violence against the Garbage dumping here.

Moreover, the documentary brings out a strong view of the suffer and suffering people in Laloor.
Many national social activists in India, like Medha Patkar, B. D. Sharma, Dr. Binayak Sen, Sarah Joseph, K. Ajitha, K. Venu and Laloor Samara Samithi (Laloor Strike Committee) Leader T.K. Vasu were especially participated and interviewed for the documentary. The film released on 02.12.2012 at Kerala Sahitya Akademi, Thrissur. The Preview show inaugurated by M.G. Sasi noted Film Director in Malayalam.

Synopsis

The documentary Says..
This is the soil of Laloor. With its fate to carry foul smell. Spread contagious diseases. This soil gave birth to a lot of fighters against the rulers. Abuse ... Fury ... Out Casting ... So much suffering ... ? Have been heard so many abuses ... All these are centuries old. The waste deposited here is not their own, it is brought from outside. Once, they felt agony deep inside. For survival... Pure water... Fresh air... For the sin of taking birth at Laloor they were not ready to suffer lifelong. They furiously resisted. The fume of their resistance spread through the length and breadth of Kerala. The world began to realize the fights of 1000 and more families to live in their native place..

Medha Patkar says..
Someone creates waste and someone is facing the result of dumping the waste. But, we can't point out a single culprit. Everyone is partly ignorant and partly callous, including the citizens. But, let us start with the rulers. They have the highest responsibility, because they are in charge or in control of resources. Community is not even given right to the land and water. They can only be given right to waste that is dumped on their land, is ridiculous.

B.D.Sharma says..
Dumping of urban waste in the villages is most unethical and it shall not be even supported by the state. It is unfortunate that the state which compares viz a viz the top gentry and so on..  they are not concerned about it.

Dr. Binayak Sen says..
Real issue is how to have decentralized treatment of urban waste. So that untreated waste doesn't have to be dumped in this way and expose citizens all across the world. Particularly in this instance in the Laloor area, the dangers of toxins is resulting from the decomposition of this urban waste.

Sarah Joseph says..
Why these much ladies and kids take part in this strike. Everywhere, they are facing many problems like waste, diseases and drinking water. There is no pure water to drink. If the water is poisonous, the ladies should bring pure water from wherever it is available. Like this, the ladies should deal with children's diseases also. There is pain in mother's mind..  she knows that there is poison in the food when she cooks for her child. Their own health problems... The ladies of Laloor are much worried about the health of their family and the society. Moreover, the main problem is that of the youth that they won't get a marital alliance. The outside people never would like to get tied with Laloor by marriage. This is a cursed land... this is a poisoned land..., that is a cursed person.. who is coming here... they are suffering from these kinds of pain and insults.

K. Venu says..
The Laloor strike has a long history. Sometimes, when it was raised by the whole people in single voice, the outcome will come out in the form of some solutions. The municipality will come with some projects. These projects would settle only a few then, the strike will be stopped. When the strike is halted,  municipality will regress from the implementation of the projects. Again when the issue returns to the surface, the strike is revived. Every time this process goes on...

T.K.Vasu says..
Though, the petitions were sent to the authorities since 1983. It never had a final solution. Laloor was a part of Ayyanthole  panchayat in 1988. Then, the panchayat could have prohibited the dumping of town waste in Laloor. But, they didn't do anything.  So, we resiliently revived the strike

Soundtrack
The song "Nagarathin Thekku Padinjaaru Konilay..." written by Sidharthan Puranattukara, composed by Avd.P.K. Sajeev, and sung by Baburaj Puthur.

Script publishing

 
After some research about the sufferings and various problems faced by people of Laloor due to the heavy dumping of Municipal Garbage of Thrissur Municipal Corporation at their premises and the associated protest manifested through various forms of strikes, Sathish Kalathil wrote the Principal Story for his documentary Laloorinu Parayanullathu. Bhasi Pangil made a Script out of this Story about Laloor.

The book, Laloorinu Parayanullathu (What has Laloor To Say) was edited by Sujith Aalungal and Published by Vidyaposhini Publications, Thrissur. The book was released on 29 August 2013 by Dr. P. V. Krishnan Nair, secretary, Kerala Sangeetha Nataka Akademi and copy received by R. Gopalakrishnan, secretary, Kerala Sahithya Akademi at Prof. Joseph Mundassery Memorial Auditorium, Thissur, associated with D.F.M.F Short Film Festival-2013 contested by Digital Film Makers' Forum Trust.

Awards
 Sakthan Thampuran Award

References

External links

 
Official Website

2010s Malayalam-language films
2012 films
2012 in the environment
Indian short documentary films
Environment

Social issues in India
Social
Films about social issues in India
2012 short documentary films
Films shot in Thrissur